Lloyd Alan Chapman is president and founder of the American Small Business League.

Life and career

Born and raised in Texas, Chapman began his career working for Texas political leader Bob Bullock. He spent eight years in the Texas Controller's office, before moving to California in 1986 to enter the computer industry. It was at this time that he first became aware of major problems in federal small business contracting programs, and became an advocate for small technology firms. In this role, he monitored federal "set-aside" contracts for small businesses. His work triggered a 1991 Congressional investigation into the Lockheed Martin F-22 Raptor that forced the Air Force and Lockheed Martin to allocate an additional $501 million to small and minority-owned firms.

By law, the federal government is obligated to award a fair portion (currently 23%) of its contracts to small businesses. But a number of federal investigations and private studies have found that the government is reporting billions of dollars in contracts to large companies as federal small business awards (see references below).

In his continuing role as a small business advocate, Chapman pursued litigation to acquire information on small business utilization in government contracts. In 1993, the U.S. Court of Appeals for the 9th Circuit ruled against the Defense Logistics Agency, forcing it to release vital information documenting small business contracting awards. This has paved the way for greater participation by small businesses in federal contracting by exposing the lack of enforcement of Congressionally mandated small business goals.

In 2003, information provided by Chapman prompted a Government Accountability Office(GAO) investigation confirming that, in direct conflict with the Small Business Act of 1953, a significant number of small business contracts were being awarded to some of the world's largest corporations.

In order to form a coalition to promote fair policy in federal small business contracting, Chapman founded a trade group, the Micro Industry Suppliers Association, in 2003. When membership began to include businesses outside the computer industry, the name of the organization was changed to the American Small Business League in 2004.

He currently resides in Southern California.

2006 accomplishments

Chapman won three federal lawsuits under freedom of information legislation during 2006 that provided evidence of fraud and abuse in federal small business contracting:

 The first lawsuit forced the SBA to release documentation that showed the agency had ignored protests that were filed by small businesses against large corporations.
 The second forced the SBA to release the name of the firm that the SBA Inspector General had recommended be debarred from government contracting for federal small business contracting fraud.
 The third forced NASA to release information that showed the agency has been reporting awards to Fortune 500 corporations as federal small business awards.

Chapman also:

 Provided information that led to a Fortune 1000 firm paying a $1 million fine this year for falsely claiming to be a small business. It is estimated that the company received about $36 million in federal small business contracts illegally.
 Organized a successful grass roots effort in April 2006 to fight unfair policies in federal small business contracting. ASBL members sent over 700 comments to the General Services Administration to protest new policies that would create bigger loopholes in small business procurement programs.
 Exposed the government's continuing efforts to hide small business contracting information, which prevents watchdog groups and the media from having access to the truth.
 Called attention to the fact that the SBA has failed to implement the women's procurement program for over five years, resulting in a loss of billions of dollars in contracting opportunities for women-owned firms
 Engaged former SBA Administrator Hector Barreto in debate on BusinessWeek.com over the validity of the SBA's reporting of small business contracting figures. Barreto later resigned from his post under controversy
 Exposed Republican efforts to close the SBA and end all federal programs for small, women-owned, minority-owned, and disabled veteran-owned firms.
 Called attention to the fact that the government has failed to penalize any firm that has misrepresented its size status in order to obtain federal small business contracts.
 Joined the SBA Inspector General in advocating for annual small business size certification to prevent fraud and abuse in small business procurement programs. Current SBA policy allows firms to maintain their size status for up to 20 years.
 Led an ongoing media campaign which resulted in over 200 articles in print and online publications as well as radio and television stories that reported on federal small business contracting issues.

References

External links

 
 
 
 

 

1949 births
American activists
Living people